The Mountain State derby is the name given to the men's soccer games between the Marshall Thundering Herd and the West Virginia Mountaineers, the only NCAA Division I programs in the state of West Virginia.  In 2019, the teams met in the second round of the 2019 NCAA Division I Men's Soccer Tournament as 11th seed Marshall defeated WVU, 2-1, in front of a then-record crowd of 2,126 fans at the Veterans Memorial Soccer Complex. In the 2022 matchup, #4 Marshall defeated unranked West Virginia 1-0 before a crowd of 2,735 in Huntington.

In 2022, both schools joined the Sun Belt Conference, Marshall as a full member and West Virginia as a men's soccer member, and the rivalry became an annual conference game.

Game results

See also
Friends of Coal Bowl – football rivalry between Marshall and West Virginia
Chesapeake Energy Capital Classic – basketball rivalry between Marshall and West Virginia

References

College soccer rivalries in the United States
Marshall Thundering Herd men's soccer
West Virginia Mountaineers men's soccer
Sun Belt Conference men's soccer